Abdur Rahman (known as Rahman; 27 February 1937 – 18 July 2005) was a Pakistani-Bangladeshi actor and film Director. He acted in Bengali, Urdu, and Pashto films in Dhaka, Karachi, and Lahore from 1958 until the 1980s.

Career
Rahman made his debut in Ehtesham's 1959 Bengali film Ei Desh Tomar Amar, as a supporting actor in a negative role. He then acted as the lead actor in Rajdhanir Buke, along with Chitra Sinha, also directed by Ehtesham. He then performed in Harano Din (1960), Joar Bhata (1965), Notun Sur, Eai To Jiban, and Antaranga, along with Shabnam and Suchanda. He performed in other films including the Urdu films Chanda, Uttaran, Talash, Preet Na Jane Reet, Milan, Gori, Jaan Baje Shehnai, Bahana, Darshan, Kangan, Piyasa, Eindhan, and Chalo Maan Gaye. He acted with actress Shabnam in most films.

Rahman was injured in a road accident on the way back from shooting the film Preet Na Jane Reet (1963). He lost one leg afterwards.

After the Bangladesh Liberation War in 1971, Rahman continued his film career in Pakistan, acting in the films Dosti, Nadan, Chahat, Do Sathi, Milan, Doraha, Lagan, Tum Salamat Raho, Dhamaka, Do Tasweerein, and 100 Rifles. Later, he returned to Dhaka and renewed his acting career. He then acted in the Bangla films Angshider, Devdas, Ghor Bhanga Shongshar, and Pahari Phul. His last acted film, Aamar Shongshar, was directed by Ashok Ghosh.

Rahman got into film production in the 1980s and produced several films including Milon.

Filmography
 Ei Desh Tomar Amar (1959, Bengali)
 Harano Din (1960, Bengali) 
 Chanda (1962, Urdu)
 Talash (1963, Urdu)
 Milan (1964, Urdu), also director
 Bahana (1965, Urdu)
 Indhan (1966, Urdu), also director
 Darshan (1967, Urdu), also director
 Gori (1968, Urdu)
 Jahan Baje Shehnai (1968, Urdu), also director
 Joar Bhata (1969, Bengali)
 Kangan (1969, Urdu), also director
 Piyasa (1969, Urdu)
 Chalo Maan Gayai (1970, Urdu), also director
 Dosti (1971, Urdu)
 Nadan (1971, Urdu)
 Chahat (1974, Urdu) 
 Do Sathi (1975 Urdu) 
 Milan (1974 Urdu)
 Tum Salamat Raho (1976) 
 Lagan (1980, Urdu)
 Do Tasvirein (1977, Urdu)
 Doraha (1978, Urdu)
 Dhamakka (1979, Urdu)
 100 Rifles (1981)

Awards
 Nigar Award
 Bachsas Award for Best Supporting Actor – 1982 for Devdas

References

Bibliography

External links 

 

1937 births
2005 deaths
Pakistani male film actors
Pakistani film directors
Pakistani film producers
Bangladeshi male film actors
Bangladeshi film producers
People from Panchagarh District
Nigar Award winners
Bachsas Award winners